Meyaneh Station ( – Īstgāh-e Meyāneh and Īstgāh-e Mīāneh) is a village and railway station in Qaflankuh-e Gharbi Rural District, in the Central District of Meyaneh County, East Azerbaijan Province, Iran. At the 2006 census, its population was 258, in 60 families.

References 

Populated places in Meyaneh County
Railway stations in Iran